A list of notable Lega Nord politicians of Italy:

A
Angelo Alessandri

B
Massimo Bitonci
Mario Borghezio
Renzo Bossi
Umberto Bossi
Gianpaolo Bottacin
Federico Bricolo
Gianluca Buonanno

C
Roberto Calderoli
Davide Caparini
Sergio Castellaneta
Roberto Castelli
Enrico Cavaliere
Domenico Comino
Roberto Cota

D
Manuela Dal Lago
Gianpaolo Dozzo

F
Gipo Farassino
Attilio Fontana
Marco Formentini

G
Luciano Gasperini
Giancarlo Gentilini
Giancarlo Giorgetti
Gian Paolo Gobbo

M
Marilena Marin
Roberto Maroni
Francesca Martini
Gianfranco Miglio
Roberto Mura

P
Giancarlo Pagliarini
Irene Pivetti

R
Marco Reguzzoni
Massimiliano Romeo

S
Matteo Salvini
Francesco Speroni

T
Flavio Tosi

Z
Luca Zaia

Lega Nord